"Don't Cry" is a song by American rapper Lil Wayne featuring fellow American rapper  XXXTentacion. "Don't Cry" was released as the second single from Lil Wayne's twelfth album Tha Carter V. The song uses vocals recorded by XXXTentacion prior to his death on June 18, 2018. It debuted and peaked at number five on the Billboard Hot 100 chart, where it became the second-highest charting song from the album and in XXXTentacion's discography.

Background and release 
The vocals used in "Don't Cry" by XXXTentacion were recorded prior to his death on June 18, 2018. Before the collaboration, Wayne did not know who XXXTentacion was. The collaboration between the two artists happened as a result of Young Money Entertainment's president Mack Maine  acquiring the rights to use the verse while sequencing and putting together the track list of the album.

Lil Wayne performed the song live for the first time on The Late Show with Stephen Colbert on December 12, 2018.

The music video was released on January 23, 2019, on what would have been XXXTentacion's 21st birthday.

Credits and personnel
Credits and personnel adapted from the liner notes of Tha Carter V.

Recording
 Recorded at YM Studios
 Mixed at Just Us Studios (Los Angeles, California)
 Mastered at SING Mastering (Atlanta, Georgia)

Management
 Published by Young Money Publishing Inc/Warner Chappell Publishing (BMI), Bad Vibes Forever Inc./ Kobalt Publishing (ASCAP), Z3N Publishing, Billions Enterprises/Songs Of Kobalt Music Publishing (BMI), Food Fight Music / Where Da Kasz At — administered by Songs of Kobalt Music Publishing (BMI)
 XXXTentacion appears courtesy of Bad Vibes Forever, LLC

Personnel
 Lil Wayne - lead vocals, songwriting
 XXXTentacion - posthumous vocals, songwriting
 Ben Billions - production, songwriting
 Z3N - production, songwriting
 Gamal Lewis - songwriting
 Fabian Marasciullo - mixing
 McCoy Socalgargoyle - assistant engineering
 Colin Leonard - mastering
 Manny Galvez - recording
 Jason Delattiboudere - assistant recording
 John Cunningham - vocal production

Charts

Certifications

References 

2018 songs
Lil Wayne songs
XXXTentacion songs
Male vocal duets
Songs released posthumously
Songs written by LunchMoney Lewis
Songs written by XXXTentacion
Songs written by Lil Wayne
Songs written by Ben Billions